Jeremy Ten (born February 21, 1989) is a Canadian former competitive figure skater. He is the 2013 Nebelhorn Trophy bronze medallist, 2014 CS Autumn Classic bronze medallist, and a three-time Canadian national medallist (silver in 2015, bronze in 2009 and 2012). He competed in the free skate at seven ISU Championships.

Personal life 
Jeremy Ten was born February 21, 1989, in Burnaby, British Columbia. He graduated from Magee Secondary School in Vancouver. In June 2015, he received a bachelor of arts degree in health sciences with a minor in kinesiology from Simon Fraser University.

Career 
Ten started ice skating as a hockey player at age seven and switched to figure skating at age nine. He began training at the BC Centre of Excellence in 2003 and skated there throughout his career.

Ten began competing on the ISU Junior Grand Prix series in 2005, placing 8th in Bulgaria. The following year, he won a bronze medal in France and placed 4th in the Netherlands before winning the Canadian national junior title at the 2007 Canadian Championships.

In the 2007–08 season, he took bronze at his JGP event in Bulgaria and placed 8th in Austria. He was 8th at the 2008 World Junior Championships.

In 2008–09, Ten made his senior international debut at two Grand Prix events and won bronze on the senior level at the 2009 Canadian Championships. He was assigned to the 2009 Four Continents where he finished 7th and then to the 2009 World Championships where he placed 17th.

In January 2011, Ten underwent surgery to repair a bone impingement problem and was off the ice for three months. In June, he sustained a spiral fracture of the left fibula. In late July 2011, Ten and his coach received an $8,000 grant from Petro-Canada.

Ten won bronze at the Nebelhorn Trophy in September 2013 and at the CS Autumn Classic, a Challenger Series event in October 2014. He received the silver medal at the 2015 Canadian Championships.

Ten announced his retirement from competition on June 12, 2015. He began skating on cruise ships in late 2016.

Programs

Competitive highlights
GP: Grand Prix; CS: Challenger Series; JGP: Junior Grand Prix

References

External links

 
 Jeremy Ten at Skate Canada

1989 births
Living people
Canadian male single skaters
Canadian sportspeople of Chinese descent
People from Burnaby
20th-century Canadian people
21st-century Canadian people